HAP2 (hapless 2), also known as GCS1 (generative cell-specific protein 1), is a family of membrane fusion proteins found in the sperm cell of diverse eukaryotes including Toxoplasma, thale cress, and fruit flies. This protein is essential for gamete fusion, and therefore fertilization, in these organisms. It is a domesticated instance of a viral class II fusion protein.

References

Protein families